François Pétis de la Croix (1653–1713) was a French orientalist.

He was born in Paris, the son of the Arabic interpreter of the French court and author, also named François Pétis de la Croix (1622–1695) and inherited this office at his father's death, afterwards transmitting it to his own son, Alexandre Louis Marie, who also became a notable orientalist. At an early age, François was sent by Colbert to the East; during the ten years he spent in Syria, Persia and Turkey he learned Arabic, Persian and Turkish and collected materials which he would use in future writings.

Travel in the Middle East
In 1670 Pétis de la Croix, age seventeen, travelled to the Middle East on an extended language course as part of a program devised by Colbert to create a pool of capable foreign officials – . After a study period in Aleppo, he arrived in 1674 in Isfahan where he stayed until June 1676. From a short description of his stay we learn of his deep interest in the manners of the "dervish":

In the same description, Pétis de la Croix tells of a prank played on him by his Agha who during a visit to a Bektashi convent caused him to pose as a shaykh: 
I said them the fatha (first sura of the Qur'an) over the meat with the usual movements; after the meal I read extensively from the Qur'an and I chose the chapters dealing with morals and not with Mahomet which I explained according to the commentaries I had read. I also clarified some difficulties they had (...) of course my Agha could not help making a mockery of this; he almost choked laughing and told everyone I had come all the way from France to teach the Asian Muslims the Qur'an.

Despite the flourishing of Orientalism in France in the 17th century, and despite the fact that Antoine Galland, Barthélemy d'Herbelot de Molainville and François Pétis de la Croix at one time frequented the Wednesday afternoon discussions –  – of Gilles Ménage together, little has remained of the explicit and detailed references to the Masnavi or Sufism in general one could have expected from Pétis de la Croix – or François Bernier for that matter.

One should however keep in mind the real risk run by deviating opinion. It was not until 1682 following the Versailles edict that only the intention to kill with poison and sacrilege coupled with that intention could be withheld as grounds for capital punishment over witchcraft. The proceedings against the Quietists thus only narrowly escaped the greater dangers of the lingering witch craze.

In 1685 concerted Catholic censorship became a matter of State after the edict of Fontainebleau; the opinion had by then developed that there was much resemblance between the Quietism of East and West (see: "Lettre sur le quiétisme des Indes" by François Bernier in Histoire des Ouvrages des Savans, Henri Basnage de Beauval (ed.), September 1688).

Later life 
He served briefly as secretary to the French ambassador in Morocco, and was interpreter to the French forces sent against Algiers, contributing to the satisfactory settlement of the treaty of peace, which was drawn up by him in Turkish and ratified in 1684. He conducted the negotiations with Tunis and Tripoli in 1685, and those with Morocco in 1687; and in 1692 he was ultimately rewarded with an appointment to the Arabic chair in the Collège de France, which he held until his death in 1713.

Works 
He published Contes Turcs (Paris, 1707), an Armenian Dictionary, and an Account of Ethiopia.

He also wrote The Thousand and One Days, a collection of fairy tales based on the model of One Thousand and One Nights. It was published in five volumes between 1710 and 1712. He supposedly translated it from a Persian compilation titled Hazar u yek ruz which he acquired from one 'Dervish Mocles' or 'Moklas' in Isfahan in 1675. In fact, it was a very free adaptation of the Turkish Ferec baʿd eş-şidde. The book's publisher Barbin asked Alain-René Lesage to rework de la Croix's translations into marketable French. Barbin also included two of the stories at the end of the eighth volume of Antoine Galland's Les mille et une nuits (1709), outraging Galland, who switched publishers for subsequent volumes. Stories from The Thousand and One Days inspired other works including Carlo Gozzi's Il re cervo (The King Stag) and Turandot.

He edited and published in 1710 his father's authoritative biography of Genghis Khan, History of Genghizcan the Great, First Emperor of the Ancient Moguls and Tartars, translated into English by Penelope Aubin and published in 1722. This work was popularized in the American colonies by Benjamin Franklin and may have influenced Thomas Jefferson's Virginia Statute for Religious Freedom.

His best-known work is his French translation of Sharaf ad-Din Ali Yazdi's Zafarnama, which was published after Pétis de la Croix's death (4 vols., Paris, 1722; Eng. trans. by J Darby, London, 1723). Although the translation is generally well-regarded, Pétis de la Croix erroneously identified Timur himself as the biography's sponsor, when in fact the book was commissioned by Timur's grandson Ibrahim Sultan.

See also
 Orientalism in early modern France
 Sufi studies
 Paul Sebag (1998), "Sur deux orientalistes français du XVIIe siècle: F. Petis de la Croix et le sieur de la Croix,"  Revue de l'Occident musulman et de la Méditerranée 25: pp. 89–117.

References

 

1653 births
1713 deaths
Academic staff of the Collège de France
French orientalists